The Carlynton School District is a small, suburban, public school district located approximately six miles west of downtown Pittsburgh, Pennsylvania.  The district covers five square miles, including the Boroughs of Carnegie, Crafton and Rosslyn Farms.  From these communities comes the name Carlynton (Carnegie, Rosslyn Farms and Crafton). According to 2000 federal census data, it serves a resident population of 15,559.  In 2009, the district residents' per capita income was $22,323, while the median family income was $46,345.

References

External links

http://kdka.com/local/Carlynton.High.School.2.389239.html
http://www.publicschoolreview.com/school_ov/school_id/68743

School districts established in 1969
School districts in Allegheny County, Pennsylvania
Education in Pittsburgh area
1969 establishments in Pennsylvania